Elyse Willems (born May 3, 1986) is a Canadian internet personality, comedian, and writer. She is best known for her work as a cast member and producer at Funhaus, a division of Rooster Teeth Productions, since November 2015. Since then, Willems has appeared and been involved in numerous productions by Rooster Teeth.

Willems published her debut novel, A Night in Halloween House, which became a bestselling Halloween children's book on Amazon in October 2020.

Biography
Willems was born and raised in Toronto, Ontario in a family of Polish descent. After graduating from the University of Toronto with a Bachelor of Arts in Political Science and Government, Willems relocated to Los Angeles in January 2012. She worked at Viacom as a production assistant on GameTrailers from August 2012, later becoming a segment producer at Defy Media in 2014, where she produced, wrote and hosted Mandatory Update, a weekly comedy news show that provided a satirical commentary of the video game industry.

In November 2015, Willems joined Rooster Teeth as a cast member of Funhaus. There, she has collaboratively produced and co-written numerous series, such as Arizona Circle, Sex Swing, and Twits & Crits, as well as producing and performing in gaming videos and podcasts. Willems has made several appearances at RTX conventions, including a Ladies of Rooster Teeth panel at RTX Sydney 2017 where she expressed her frustration at credit for things she has done being given to her male peers in the past, and on the series Always Open, hosted by fellow Canadian Rooster Teeth member and friend Barbara Dunkelman. In 2017, a shortened clip focusing primarily on Willems from one of Funhaus' videos went viral. The clip featured Funhaus members, including her husband, criticizing a female character for wearing a ponytail while Willems, who is wearing a ponytail in the clip, reacts in the background. The clip appeared in one of PewDiePie's videos, and garnered almost fifteen million views worldwide. Willems clarified that the intent was humorous and that her reaction was deliberately comedic.

In 2020, Willems served as the series creator and one of the participants in Last Laugh, a Rooster Teeth series centered around a social experiment where twelve contestants spent six hours in one room while trying to make each other laugh or smile. Willems also streams with her husband James in order to fundraise for various charities and causes, and is among the popular streamers who raised funds for The Jimmy Fund to support research at Dana–Farber Cancer Institute on November 1, 2020.

Willems self-published her first novel, titled A Night in Halloween House, in October 2020. It was released on Amazon as both paperback and Kindle editions, and became the bestselling Halloween children's book. The novel received predominantly five star reviews on the novel's Amazon page and its Goodreads counterpart, with readers praising the sense of Halloween nostalgia that Willems set out to convey in the book. In 2021, she and James were credited as writers for IllFonic's Arcadegeddon.

Personal life
Willems is married to fellow performer and Funhaus cast member James Willems, and they live in Los Angeles, California.

Filmography

Film

Web series

Video games

References

External links
 Official website
 Elyse Willems on Twitter
 Elyse Willems on IMDb
 Elyse Willems on Instagram

1986 births
Living people
Actresses from Toronto
Canadian emigrants to the United States
Comedians from Toronto
Rooster Teeth people
University of Toronto alumni
Canadian people of Polish descent
Canadian stand-up comedians
Canadian women comedians
Canadian voice actresses
Canadian children's writers
Writers from Toronto
21st-century Canadian women writers
21st-century Canadian screenwriters